Heteroconger chapmani is an eel in the family Congridae (conger/garden eels). It was described by Albert William Herre in 1923. It is a marine, tropical eel which is known from a single specimen collected from the Philippines, in the western central Pacific Ocean. The holotype specimen measured . The species is now considered unidentifiable due to the lack of detail in the author's description, and because the only known specimen was destroyed during World War II.

References

chapmani
Taxa named by Albert William Herre
Fish described in 1923